Lin Tianmiao (born 1961) is a contemporary Chinese installation artist and textile designer. She sometimes makes use of everyday objects.

Life 

Lin Tianmiao was born in 1961 in Taiyuan, Shanxi province, China. Her father was an ink painter and master calligrapher and her mother studied and taught traditional dance. She received a BFA from Capital Normal University in 1961, and later studied at the Art Students League in New York City in 1989.

She lived in Brooklyn from 1988 to 1994. She returned to Beijing in 1995 and converted her home into an open studio which was an important venue for Apartment Art. She is married to Wang Gongxin and has a son, Shaun. She has said that life's experience is constantly changing, and the way her works are presented is also constantly changing.

Work 

Lin started her career as a textile designer and used the skills she had learned in her later work. She changed from textile design to art because she felt like design was limiting her creativity and suppressing her expression. Lin and her husband participated in the Beijing Young Artists' Painting Society, which was contiguous with the '85 Art New Wave Movement. Her work is multifaceted. She sees it as representing both tradition and newness. She co-founded the Loft New Media Art Center in 2001.

In the 1990s Lin created works with materials of contrasting textures, often using undyed cotton thread. She has also worked in other media such as sculpture, photography, video and mixed media. An early work, The Proliferation of Thread Winding (1995), included 20,000 balls of thread attached with needles to a rice paper-covered iron bed. In 2012, she made a series of works using a wooden frame, threads and synthetic bones; Minty Blue (2012) and Duckling Yellow (2012) were two works in the series.

At the 2002 Shanghai Biennale she and her husband collaborated on Here or There; she described the collaboration as "unspeakable", and resolved to "never cooperate anymore." She had a 2006 residency at the Singapore Tyler Print Institute where she experimented with paper media and printmaking. Since the mid-1990s, her works have been included in every major international museum show on Chinese contemporary art.

Feminist themes

Lin's work often deals with themes traditionally applicable to women. With its focus on the manifestations of domesticity and motherhood, critics have compared her work to Western feminist art , she has rejected that characterization.

List of selected artworks and exhibitions
 The Proliferation of Thread Winding, 1995, Asia Society Museum, New York, 2012
 Bound and Unbound, Art Museum of China Central Academy of Fine Arts, Beijing, China, 1997
 Focus on Paper, Singapore Tyler Print Institute, Singapore, 2007
 Mother's!!!, 2008, Asia Society Museum, New York, 2012
 More or Less the Same, 2011, Asia Society Museum, New York, 2012
 Systems, Rockbund Art Museum, Shanghai, China, 2018

References 

1961 births
Living people
20th-century Chinese women artists
20th-century Chinese artists
21st-century Chinese women artists
21st-century Chinese artists
Chinese installation artists
People from Taiyuan
Textile designers
Women installation artists
Artists from Shanxi